Zygonaria is a genus of brachiopods belonging to the family Terebratulidae.

The species of this genus are found in Southern Europe.

Species:

Zygonaria davidsoni 
Zygonaria joloensis

References

Brachiopod genera
Terebratulida